Shrewsbury was a parliamentary constituency in England, centred on the town of Shrewsbury in Shropshire.

It was founded in 1290 as parliamentary borough, returning two members to the House of Commons of England until 1707, then of the House of Commons of Great Britain from 1707 to 1800, and of the House of Commons of the United Kingdom from 1801 to 1885. Under the Redistribution of Seats Act 1885, its representation was reduced to one Member of Parliament (MP).

The parliamentary borough was abolished at with effect from the 1918 general election, and the name transferred to a new county constituency. The constituency was renamed Shrewsbury and Atcham, but continued with the exact same boundaries as had been in effect from 1974-1983.

Famous MPs have included Sir Philip Sidney in 1581, Robert Clive (known as 'Clive of India') from 1761 to his death in 1774, and Benjamin Disraeli (later Prime Minister) in 1841–47.

Boundaries 
1918–1950: The Borough of Shrewsbury, and the Rural Districts of Atcham and Chirbury.

1950–1974: The Borough of Shrewsbury, and the Rural District of Atcham.

1974–1983: As prior but with redrawn boundaries.

History

By the mid eighteenth century Shrewsbury was known as an independent constituency.  The right of election was vested in resident burgesses paying scot and lot.  By 1722 the number of voters exceeded 1300 but Parliament sharply reduced the number by excluding parts of Shrewsbury from the parliamentary borough.

Members of Parliament

Borough of Shrewsbury 

Constituency created (1290)

MPs 1290–1660

MPs 1660–1885

MPs 1885–1918

Shrewsbury division of Shropshire

MPs 1918–1983

Election results

Elections in the 1830s

Elections in the 1840s

Elections in the 1850s

Elections in the 1860s
Slaney's death caused a by-election.

Elections in the 1870s
Clement's death caused a by-election.

Elections in the 1880s 

 

Cotes was appointed a Lord Commissioner of the Treasury, requiring a by-election.

Representation reduced to one Member

Elections in the 1890s

Elections in the 1900s

Elections in the 1910s 

General Election 1914–15:

Another General Election was required to take place before the end of 1915. The political parties had been making preparations for an election to take place and by July 1914, the following candidates had been selected; 
Unionist: George Lloyd
Liberal:

Elections in the 1920s

Elections in the 1930s

Elections in the 1940s 
General Election 1939–40:

Another General Election was required to take place before the end of 1940. The political parties had been making preparations for an election to take place from 1939 and by the end of this year, the following candidates had been selected; 
Conservative: Arthur Duckworth
Liberal: John Share Jones
Labour: S N Chapman

The outbreak of World War II in September 1939 caused general elections to be suspended until 1945.

Elections in the 1950s

Elections in the 1960s

Elections in the 1970s

References 
Craig, F. W. S. (1983). British parliamentary election results 1918-1949 (3 ed.). Chichester: Parliamentary Research Services. .

Sources

See also 
Parliamentary constituencies in Shropshire#Historical constituencies
List of former United Kingdom Parliament constituencies
Unreformed House of Commons
  The History of Parliament: the House of Commons - Shrewsbury, Borough, 1386 to 1831

Parliamentary constituencies in Shropshire (historic)
Constituencies of the Parliament of the United Kingdom established in 1290
Constituencies of the Parliament of the United Kingdom disestablished in 1983
Shrewsbury